Chifir (or alternatively) is an exceptionally strong tea, associated with and brewed in Soviet and post-Soviet detention facilities such as gulags and prisons.

Etymology
The etymology is uncertain but is thought to come from the word  meaning a strong Caucasian wine, or a Siberian word for wine that has gone off and become sour and acidic.

Preparation

	
Chifir is typically prepared with 5–8 tablespoons (50–100 ml) of loose tea (or tea bags) per person poured on top of the boiled water.  It is brewed without stirring – at least until the leaves drop to the bottom of the cup. During the brewing process, the leaves start to pour adenine and guanine into the water, which does not happen during traditional tea-making. Sugar is sometimes added; the nature of the brew tends to result in a bitter flavor.
	
It is to be carefully sipped, otherwise it may cause vomiting. Ultimately, making chifir involves brewing a great deal of black tea and for a long time. It may be left to brew overnight and drunk either hot or cold.

In popular culture
Irina Ratushinskaya describes the brewing of narcotically strong chifir as a banned activity sometimes undertaken by prisoners, in her memoir of her years as a political prisoner, Grey Is The Colour Of Hope.
In Vasily Aksyonov's novel Ozhog ('The Burn'), the convict Shilo makes chifir in a tushonka tin and gives it to Tolya von Steinbock. Tolya falls into a blissful, dreamlike state, but is awake enough to overhear an escape plan being hatched.
 In the Gabriele Salvatores-directed film Deadly Code, the character played by John Malkovich prepares and describes chifir to the young Kolyma
In the novel Gorky Park by Martin Cruz Smith (1981) the main character Arkady Renko drinks chifir on a train with workers on their way to a work camp.
 Several characters drink chifir in The Kolyma Tales, a collection of short stories about Gulag life by former Gulag prisoner Varlam Shalamov.
 In Jules Verne's novel In Search of the Castaways when the heroes visit Australia, Paganel requests tea made according to local custom, and is served a drink made by boiling half a pound of tea in a litre of water for four hours. Shalamov mentions this in his aforementioned stories to demonstrate chifir' is not a new invention.
 In the book series Ciaphas Cain, many characters drink a version of Chifir called Tanna.

See also
 Sa'idi tea, a somewhat similar beverage (essentially a weaker grade, but consumed in larger quantities) drunk in Upper Egypt and among Sa'idi people elsewhere
 Zavarka, concentrated tea used in brewing tea from a Samovar

References

Tea varieties
Russian tea
Prison drinks